General linear methods (GLMs) are a large class of numerical methods used to obtain numerical solutions to ordinary differential equations. They include multistage Runge–Kutta methods that use intermediate collocation points, as well as linear multistep methods that save a finite time history of the solution. John C. Butcher originally coined this term for these methods, and has written a series of review papers

a book chapter
and a textbook
on the topic. His collaborator, Zdzislaw Jackiewicz also has an extensive textbook on the topic.  The original class of methods were originally proposed by
Butcher (1965), Gear (1965) and Gragg and Stetter (1964).

Some definitions 
Numerical methods for first-order ordinary differential equations approximate solutions to initial value problems of the form

 

 

where h is the time step (sometimes referred to as ).

A description of the method

We follow Butcher (2006), pps 189–190 for our description,
although we note that this method can be found elsewhere.

Stage values  and stage derivatives,  are computed from approximations, at time step :

The stage values are defined by two matrices,  and :

and the update to time  is defined by two matrices,  and :

where  stands for the
tensor product.

Examples

We present an example described in (Butcher, 1996).  This method consists of a single 'predicted' step, and 'corrected' step, that uses extra information about the time history, as well as a single intermediate stage value.

An intermediate stage value is defined as something that looks like it came from a linear multistep method:

An initial 'predictor'  uses the stage value  together with two pieces of time history:

and the final update is given by:

The concise table representation for this method is given by:

See also 
Runge–Kutta methods
Linear multistep methods
Numerical methods for ordinary differential equations

Notes

References 
 
 
 
 .

External links 
General Linear Methods

Numerical differential equations